The W. H. Baugh House, in Lincoln County, Idaho near Shoshone, Idaho, was built in 1910 and was listed on the National Register of Historic Places in 1983.

It is a lava rock stone house built by "a competent stone mason", but the house's "boxed wooden lintels suggest that he was unfamiliar with the use of concrete. It was the country house of Shoshone dentist Dr. W. H. Baugh.

References

National Register of Historic Places in Lincoln County, Idaho
Houses completed in 1910
Lava rock buildings and structures